936 Kunigunde (prov. designation:  or ) is a dark Themistian asteroid from the outer regions of the asteroid belt, approximately  in diameter. It was discovered on 8 September 1920, by German astronomer Karl Reinmuth at the Heidelberg-Königstuhl State Observatory. The carbonaceous B-type asteroid has a rotation period of 9.4 hours. It was named "Kunigunde", a common German female name unrelated to the discoverer's contemporaries, that was taken from the almanac Lahrer Hinkender Bote.

Orbit and classification 

Kunigunde is a core member of the Themis family, when applying the hierarchical clustering method to its proper orbital elements. The very large family of carbonaceous asteroids is named after 24 Themis. Kunigunde orbits the Sun in the outer main-belt at a distance of 2.6–3.7 AU once every 5 years and 6 months (2,025 days; semi-major axis of 3.13 AU). Its orbit has an eccentricity of 0.18 and an inclination of 2° with respect to the ecliptic. The body's observation arc begins at Heidelberg with its official discovery observation on 8 September 1920.

Naming 

This minor planet was named "Kunigunde", after a female name picked from the Lahrer Hinkender Bote, published in Lahr, southern Germany. A Hinkender Bote (lit. "limping messenger") was a very popular almanac, especially in the Alemannic-speaking region from the late 17th throughout the early 20th centuries. The calendar section contains feast days, the dates of important fairs and astronomical ephemerides. For 3 March, the calendar gives "Kunigund" as the German name day analogue next to Kunigunde and Titian, the protestant and catholic entries in the calendar of saints, likely referring to Cunigunde of Luxembourg and Titian of Brescia.

Reinmuth's calendar names 

As with 22 other asteroids—starting with 913 Otila, and ending with 1144 Oda—Reinmuth selected names from this calendar due to his many asteroid discoveries that he had trouble thinking of proper names. These names are not related to the discoverer's contemporaries. Lutz Schmadel, the author of the Dictionary of Minor Planet Names learned about Reinmuth's source of inspiration from private communications with Dutch astronomer Ingrid van Houten-Groeneveld, who worked as a young astronomer at Heidelberg.

Physical characteristics 

In both the Tholen- and SMASS-like taxonomy of the Small Solar System Objects Spectroscopic Survey (S3OS2), Kunigunde is a B-type asteroid, a somewhat brighter spectral type than the common C type typical for Themistian asteroids.

Rotation period and poles 

In March 2018, a rotational light curve of Kunigunde was obtained from photometric observations by French amateur astronomer René Roy. Light-curve analysis gave a well-defined rotation period of  hours with a brightness variation of  magnitude. Photometry by Angeli and Guimarães at observatories in Brazil and Argentina gave a similar period of  hours. In 2013, an international study modeled a light curve with a sidereal period of 8.82653 hours and found two spin axes at (47.0°, 57.0°) and (234.0°, 50.0°) in ecliptic coordinates (λ, β).

Diameter and albedo 

The Collaborative Asteroid Lightcurve Link derives an albedo of 0.0792 and a diameter of 39.29 kilometers based on an absolute magnitude of 10.4. An asteroid occultation on 21 November 2004, gave a best-fit ellipse dimension of 39.0 × 39.0 km. These timed observations are taken when the asteroid passes in front of a distant star. However, the quality of the measurement is poorly rated.

References

External links 
 Lightcurve Database Query (LCDB), at www.minorplanet.info
 Dictionary of Minor Planet Names, Google books
 Asteroids and comets rotation curves, CdR – Geneva Observatory, Raoul Behrend
 Discovery Circumstances: Numbered Minor Planets (1)-(5000) – Minor Planet Center
 
 

000936
Discoveries by Karl Wilhelm Reinmuth
Named minor planets
19200908